John Van Blom (born December 1, 1947) is an American rower. He competed at the 1968 Summer Olympics, 1972 Summer Olympics and the 1976 Summer Olympics. He was married to the sculler Joan Lind.

References

External links
 

1947 births
Living people
American male rowers
Olympic rowers of the United States
Rowers at the 1968 Summer Olympics
Rowers at the 1972 Summer Olympics
Rowers at the 1976 Summer Olympics
Sportspeople from Long Beach, California
World Rowing Championships medalists for the United States